The 1981 Santiago International Championships was a men's tennis tournament played on outdoor clay courts in Santiago, Chile that was part of the Grand Prix tennis circuit. It was the sixth and last edition of the tournament and was held from 21 November through 27 November 1981. Second-seeded Hans Gildemeister won the singles title, his second at the event after 1979.

Finals

Singles
 Hans Gildemeister defeated  Andrés Gómez 6–4, 7–5
 It was Gildemeister's 1st singles title of the year and the 3rd of his career.

Doubles
 Hans Gildemeister /   Andrés Gómez defeated  Ricardo Cano /  Belus Prajoux 6–2, 7–6

References

External links
 ITF tournament edition details

Chilean International
1981 in Chilean sport